Histoire (French for 'story' or 'history') may refer to:

 Histoire TV, a French television channel
 Historia (TV channel), or Canal Histoire, a Canadian television channel
 L'Histoire, a French magazine
 , a 1967 novel by Claude Simon

See also 

 , a Japanese manga comic book by Hitoshi Iwaaki

 History (disambiguation)
 Historia (disambiguation)
 Histories (disambiguation)